Emil Jungblut, also Emil Jungbluth written, (11 June 1888 – 24 April 1955) was a German sculptor.

Life 
Born in Düsseldorf, Jungblut first attended the Kunstgewerbeschule Düsseldorf and later became a master student at the Kunstakademie Düsseldorf. To broaden his knowledge, he spent some time in Paris and made several trips to France, Italy and the Netherlands. Jungblut was a member of the Malkasten Artist association, of which he was a member of the board for a long time.

In the early 1930s Jungblut had moved to Düsseldorf-Oberkassel and was given a studio in the Neue Akademie in Stockum. In the 1940s Jungblut's studio was located in the house at Schanzenstrasse 115, on the site of the barrel warehouse of the factory for chemical oils and fats Dr. A. Schmitz. The homeless messenger boy and model of the art academy  also lived here among the barrels of the warehouse.

August Bischoff in Düsseldorf-Oberkassel. In this bronze and iron foundry, bronze statues from the surrounding area were melted down for armament purposes during the Second World War.

Family 
Jungblut was a son of the landscape painter  (1860-1912), who came to Düsseldorf from Saarburg near Trier in 1885. His brothers Walter (1892-1941) and Hans were also painters. Walter Jungblut's wife was also a Düsseldorf painter. She was born Johanette Blum in Benrath in 1909 and died in Düsseldorf in 2003 at the age of 66.

Work 

Thematically, Jungblut devoted most of his work to portraits. However, he also created a number of animal sculptures and free figures. In 1913 and 1920, he participated in exhibitions with masks, portrait figures and sculptures of dancers and received critical acclaim. Numerous small sculptures such as Salome, Colombine, Harlequin and portraits by Jungblut, for example the bust of Reich President Paul von Hindenburg, are now privately owned. The 1943 marble bust of Friedrich Heinrich Jacobi now stands in the entrance to the Malkastenpark.

Exhibitions 
 1913: Große Kunstausstellung Düsseldorf
 1939: Große Deutsche Kunstausstellung, Munich.
 1941: Große Deutsche Kunstausstellung, Munich.
 1956: Kunstverein für die Rheinlande und Westfalen in the Alte Kunsthalle at

Works in the open 

 Heinrich-Heine-Büste (1909), Marmor, Bolkerstraße, Düsseldorf
 Hartwarder Friese (1914), Rodenkirchen, Friesendenkmal zum Andenken an die Schlacht an der Hartwarder Landwehr von 1514
 Ehrendenkmal für gefallene deutsche Soldaten (1918), Thiaucourt, France
 Kiepenkerl (ca. 1920), auf dem Dach des ehemaligen Pavillons am Worringer Platz, Düsseldorf
 Muschelkalkportale mit Kinderfiguren (ca. 1926), Lutherkirche, Kopernikusstraße 9, Düsseldorf-Bilk
 Rheinschiffer um 1850 (ca. 1930), Muschelkalk auf Kalksteinplatte, am Robert-Lehr-Ufer nördlich der Rheinterrasse am Biergarten sowie am Rheinpark Golzheim, Düsseldorf.
 Friedrich Karl Henkel-Denkmal (1938) on the Henkel Factory site, Düsseldorf-Holthausen
 Eisenbahn-Gedenktafel (1938) in north tunnel of the Düsseldorf Hauptbahnhof on the 100th anniversary of the first railway line in Germany
 Zwirnmeisterin (1939) for the  company, Hilden
 Willi-Weidenhaupt-Büste (1940),  Haus, Mertensgasse 1, Düsseldorf

References

Further reading 
 Werner Alberg: Düsseldorfer Kunstszene 1933–1945. Düsseldorf 1987, .
 Jörg A. E. Heimeshoff, Norbert Beleke: Denkmalgeschützte Häuser in Düsseldorf mit Garten- und Bodendenkmälern. Nobel, Essen 2001, 
 James A. Mackay: Dictionary of Western Skulptures in Bronze. Antique Collectors Club Woodbridge, 1977, .

External links 

 Emil Jungblut in Stadt Hilden; Arbeitsgruppe Geoportal, retrievred 5 September 2021

20th-century German sculptors
Art Deco sculptors
1888 births
1955 deaths
Artists from Düsseldorf